The Minerals Yearbook is an annual publication from the United States Geological Survey. It reviews the mineral and material industries of the United States and other countries. The Minerals Yearbook contains statistical production data as well as information on economic and technical trends. First published in 1933, it was preceded by The Mineral Resources of the United States.

Contents 

Current issues are published in three volumes:
 Volume I – Metals and Minerals  contains chapters on around 90 commercially important mined commodities
 Volume II - Area Reports: Domestic reviews mineral industry of US on a per-State basis
 Volume III - Area Reports: International reviews world mineral industry on a per-country basis

References

External links
 
 Digitized issues 1933–1993 hosted at the University of Wisconsin Libraries

Geology literature
United States Geological Survey